Roberto Carballés Baena and Alejandro Davidovich Fokina were the defending champions, but Davidovich Fokina chose to participate in Marseille instead. Carballés Baena partnered Federico Coria but lost in the first round to Raven Klaasen and Ben McLachlan.

Simone Bolelli and Máximo González won the title, defeating Federico Delbonis and Jaume Munar in the final, 7–6(7–4), 6–4.

Seeds

Draw

Draw

References

 Main draw

Chile Open - Doubles
2021 Doubles